Thomas Gillespie may refer to:

Thomas Gillespie (minister) (1708–1774), Scottish church leader
Thomas Gillespie (North Carolina plantation owner) (1719–1797), plantation owner and Revolutionary War veteran
Thomas Gillespie (Wisconsin politician) (1831–1914), member of the Wisconsin State Assembly
Thomas Gillespie (rower) (1892–1914), Scottish rower
Thomas Andrew Gillespie (1852–1926), American businessman known for T. A. Gillespie Company Shell Loading Plant explosion
Thomas F. Gillespie (1838–1893), Irish-born merchant and political figure in Canada
Thomas Haining Gillespie (1876–1967), Scottish zoologist and broadcaster
Thomas Gillespie (geographer), American geographer and professor
Thomas Gillespie (epidemiologist), American epidemiologist